Sophie Warny (born 1969) is a Belgian Antarctic researcher, best known for her work on palynology. As an associate professor at Louisiana State University in the Department of Geology and Geophysics and one of the curators at the Museum of Natural Science, Warny studies past climate change patterns by examining fossilized pollen and spores. She is currently the vice president of the Gulf Coast Section of the Society for Sedimentary Geology (GCSSEPM).

Early life and education 
Warny was educated at the University of Louvain (UCLouvain) where she earned a BS and a PhD in Marine Geology and Micropaleontology; and at the Université de Liège where she earned a DEA in Oceanography.

Career and impact 
After completing her Ph.D., Warny came to the U.S. where she held a joint appointed as assistant professor of research at Louisiana State University and education director at the Louisiana Museum of Natural Science.  In 2008–2014 she was appointed assistant professor and in 2014 promoted to associate professor.  She has continued her involvement with the Natural Science Museum, where she currently serves as one of the curators for the museum.

Warny is a palynologists/paleobotanist and has played a key role in expanding our understanding of Antarctic climate evolution. Working with the Antarctic Offshore Stratigraphy (ANTOSTRAT) team, she provided evidence for Antarctica having experienced significant warming during the mid-Miocene, when land temperatures reached 10 °C, and that liquid precipitation was notably higher at that time. Later, working with SHALDRIL cores she established compelling evidence that the Antarctic Peninsula lagged the rest of the continent by several million years in its transition into polar conditions. In recent years her research has reached further back in geological time to include the warm Eocene and Oligocene, providing new insights into how Antarctica transitioned from Greenhouse to Icehouse conditions.

Throughout her career, Warny has remained heavily engaged in public education through her involvement with the LSU Museum of Natural Science.  She has helped to design exhibits that have received national recognition. She has also played a key role in establishing new techniques in forensic palynology that have been used nationally. One of her greatest contributions was as a key player in the highly successful Polar Palooza program.

In addition to conducting paleoenvironmental research in Antarctica, she is also working on sections in the Mediterranean Sea (her doctoral focus), in the Gulf of Mexico, in Canada, in Tanzania, and in Papua New Guinea via doctoral student projects and collaborations. To this date, she has advised 15 MS and PhD projects.

Awards and honors 
Warny was awarded the AASP Graduate Student Award in 1996, a UCL Dissertation Award in 1999, a NSF CAREER Award in 2011, and the LSU Rising Faculty Research Award in 2014.

Warny was nominated as one of the six 2018–2019 AAPG Distinguished Lecturers. AAPG, the American Association of Petroleum Geologists is an international organization with over 38000 members in 100-plus countries.  The interview can be viewed here:

https://www.aapg.org/videos/interview/Articleid/50444/digging-deeper-with-sophie-warny

Selected works

References

External links 
 
 The Many Impacts of Palynology – Sophie Warny's Distinguished Lecture on American Association of Petroleum Geologists
 Digging Deeper with Sophie Warny – an interview on American Association of Petroleum Geologists

1969 births
Women Antarctic scientists
Belgian women scientists
Belgian paleontologists
American paleontologists
Palynologists
Paleobotanists
Université catholique de Louvain alumni
University of Liège alumni
Louisiana State University faculty
Living people
American women academics
21st-century American women scientists